Dato' Seri Hamzah bin Zainudin (born 12 March 1957) is a Malaysian politician who has served as the 17th Leader of the Opposition since December 2022 and the Member of Parliament (MP) for Larut since March 2008. He served as the Minister of Home Affairs for the second term in the Barisan Nasional (BN) administration under former Prime Minister Ismail Sabri Yaakob from August 2021 to the collapse of the BN administration in November 2022 and the first term in the Perikatan Nasional (PN) administration under former Prime Minister Muhyiddin Yassin from March 2020 to the collapse of the PN administration in August 2021, Minister of Domestic Trade, Cooperatives and Consumerism, Deputy Minister of Foreign Affairs, Deputy Minister of Plantation Industries and Commodities and Deputy Minister of Housing and Local Government in the BN administration under former Prime Ministers Abdullah Ahmad Badawi and Najib Razak from March 2008 to the collapse of the BN administration in May 2018 as well as Senator from September 2000 to September 2006. He is a member of the Malaysian United Indigenous Party (BERSATU), a component party of the Perikatan Nasional (PN) coalition and was a member of the United Malays National Organisation (UMNO), a component party of the Barisan Nasional (BN) coalition. He has also served as Secretary-General of both BERSATU and PN since March 2020.

Early life and education
Hamzah was born on 12 March 1957 in Perak, Federation of Malaya (now Malaysia). He was a student at Sekolah Tuanku Abdul Rahman (STAR) who was known for bullying his schoolmates. He received his Diploma in Quantity Surveying from University of Technology Malaysia in 1975.

Early career
Hamzah began his career as a footballer (Selangor FA) and general manager with Maju Bangun Sdn Bhd, a subsidiary company of the Perak State Development Corporation from 1980 till 1987. He has also served as a member of the board of Ipoh City Council and Stadium Merdeka Corporation from 1987 to 1993 and 1991 to 1997 respectively. In 1989, he ventured into private business and sat on several companies listed on Bursa Malaysia Securities Berhad (known then as the Kuala Lumpur Stock Exchange). He held various chairman and deputy chairman duties, including chairman of FELCRA Berhad, the Federal Land Consolidation and Rehabilitation Authority that oversees land management and development of agro land owned by the individuals and states.

Political career
Hamzah was elected to the House of Representatives in the 2008 election and was appointed a Deputy Minister of Housing and Local Government. He was previously a member of the Malaysian Senate.

He served as the Minister of Domestic Trade, Cooperatives and Consumerism, Deputy Minister of Foreign Affairs, Deputy Minister of Plantation Industries and Commodities and Deputy Minister of Housing and Local Government in the Barisan Nasional (BN) administration under former Prime Ministers Abdullah Ahmad Badawi and Najib Razak from March 2008 to the defeat of BN in the 2018 general election in May 2018. He has also served as the Member of Parliament (MP) for Larut since March 2008. Presently he is a member of the Malaysian United Indigenous Party (BERSATU) and its 3rd Secretary-General since March 2020, a component party of the ruling PN coalition and he also serves as its 1st Secretary-General since August 2020. He was a member of the then-ruling United Malays National Organisation (UMNO), a component party of the BN coalition. He subsequently resigned from UMNO to join BERSATU in December 2018.

In 2020, when the Pakatan Harapan government crumpled due to Mahathir Mohamad's sudden resignation after trying to eradicate those who are involved in the Sheraton Move but failed. He was elected as the Home Minister by the newly appointed Prime Minister Muhyiddin Yassin in Muhyiddin cabinet. He then retained as the Home Minister in Ismail Sabri cabinet.

Controversies and issues

Divorcing his first wife
In 2004, he was asked to pay his first wife Nooraini Rashid RM11.2 million in settlements for allegedly divorcing her to marry a much younger woman. In 2007 however, the Syariah Appeals Court allowed for his appeal to not pay his ex-wife.

Anwar was sued for allegedly harassing his second wife
In August 2008, former best friend and opposition leader Anwar Ibrahim, filed a defamation suit against him seeking RM10 million in damages over Hamzah’s allegations that Anwar had harassed his wife in 1998. Hamzah allegedly made the remark when campaigning during the Permatang Pauh by-election in August 2008, which subsequently saw Anwar’s return to parliament after a 10-year absence.

Intervention in PDRM
In 2021, he was caught having a phone conversation with the soon-to-retire inspector-general of police (IGP) to allow him to internally transfer staffs and also enable him to have over certain jurisdiction of Polis Diraja Malaysia (PDRM) which will indirectly interfere with the operation. At the IGP's last week in office, Abdul Hamid Bador revealed all the dirty tricks of Hamzah trial efforts to interfere with the PDRM and how it will affect the PDRM's reputation. He acknowledged that the voice of the recording was his and stand being corrected as it is not unlawful despite IGP's comment on how politician's interference will make operations hard for the PDRM.

Personal life
Hamzah was married to Noraini Abdul Rashid in 1981 before divorcing her in 1996 to marry his second wife, Norashikin Abdul Ghani. He has 5 children.

Election results

Honours

Honours of Malaysia
  :
  Officer of the Order of the Defender of the Realm (KMN) (2000)
  :
  Knight Commander of the Order of Tuanku Jaafar (DPTJ) – Dato' (1997)
  :
  Distinguished Conduct Medal (PPT) (1990)
  Commander of the Order of the Perak State Crown (PMP) (1992)
  Knight Commander of the Order of the Perak State Crown (DPMP) – Dato' (2002)
  Knight Grand Commander of the Order of the Perak State Crown (SPMP) – Dato' Seri (2015)
  :
 Grand Commander of the Order of Kinabalu (SPDK) – Datuk Seri Panglima (2020)
  :
  Grand Knight of the Order of Sultan Ahmad Shah of Pahang (SSAP) – Dato' Sri (2021)

See also
 Larut (federal constituency)

References

Living people
1957 births
People from Perak
Malaysian people of Malay descent
Malaysian people of Indonesian descent
Malaysian Muslims
Malaysian businesspeople
Malaysian United Indigenous Party politicians
Former United Malays National Organisation politicians
Independent politicians in Malaysia
Government ministers of Malaysia
Home ministers of Malaysia
Members of the Dewan Rakyat
Members of the Dewan Negara
Officers of the Order of the Defender of the Realm
Grand Commanders of the Order of Kinabalu
21st-century Malaysian politicians